This is a list of bridges on the National Register of Historic Places in the U.S. state of Minnesota.

References

External links
 Historic Bridges–Minnesota Department of Transportation

 
Minnesota
Bridges
Bridges